Ajeya Raj Sumargi is the chairman of the Muktishree group of companies. He is also the executive director of the Nepal Satellite Telecom Pvt. Ltd. (Hello Nepal), which is a GSM based European JV cellular services provider company that was launched in 2007 February from the Mid-West region of Nepal.

He is also the promoting director of the telecommunication giant the Ncell Pvt. Ltd. (formerly Spice Nepal Pvt. Ltd.) with the brand name Mero Mobile now Ncell which started its operations with an investment of two billion.

Investments
On 22 December 2013 Sumargi announced at a press release that his company would invest 23 billion NRS. The investments would be made for Nepal Satellite Telecom, a new five star hotel and for the new cement plant.

Social service
His Muktishree group of companies has ventured into a social business. The group is all set to implement a project in partnership with Rural Shores, India and the Inclusive Ventures Limited that aims to empower Nepali rural youths through skill development training's and provide employment opportunities to some of them who excels during the training.

Controversies
Sumargi has been involved in a lot of controversies concerning money laundering in Nepal. He has been in and out of court for the same multiple times.

References

1963 births
Living people
People from Hetauda
Nepalese businesspeople